Associação Tupy de Esportes is a football club in the city of Jussara, in the state of Goiás that competes in the third division of Campeonato Goiano.

History
Founded on November 20, 1963 in the city of Jussara in the state of Goiás, the club is affiliated to Federação Goiana de Futebol and has played in Campeonato Goiano (Second Division) three times and Third Division two times.

References 

Association football clubs established in 1963
Football clubs in Goiás